The 1892 VMI Keydets football team represented the Virginia Military Institute (VMI) in their second season of organized football. The Keydets went 4–0–1, a game better than they were the previous season.

Schedule

References

VMI
VMI Keydets football seasons
College football undefeated seasons
VMI Keydets football